Whitehaugh Oval is a cricket ground in Paisley, Renfrewshire, Scotland. It has been the home ground of Kelburne Cricket Club since their previous ground at Blackhall was lost to development in 1898. The new ground was opened with a match against West of Scotland on 29 April 1899.

The first Scotland match held on the ground came in 1947 when they played a minor match against the touring South Africans.  Scotland first played a first-class match there in 1952 against Ireland.  The ground held five further first-class matches, the last of which saw Scotland play Ireland in 1960.  Other teams to visit in first-class matches included Lancashire, Yorkshire and the touring Indians.

Records

First-class
 Highest team total: 489 all out by Scotland v Ireland, 1954
 Lowest team total: 126 all out by Ireland v Scotland, 1952
 Highest individual innings: 153 not out by Polly Umrigar for Indians v Scotland, 1959
 Best bowling in an innings: 7 for 84 by Mike Kerrigan for Scotland v Ireland, 1960
 Best bowling in a match: 11 for 144 by Malcolm Hilton for Lancashire v Scotland, 1956

References

External links

Whitehaugh Cricket Ground at ESPNcricinfo

Cricket grounds in Scotland
Sports venues in Paisley, Renfrewshire
Sports venues completed in 1899